In physics, the gyromagnetic ratio (also sometimes known as the magnetogyric ratio in other disciplines) of a particle or system is the ratio of its magnetic moment to its angular momentum, and it is often denoted by the symbol , gamma. Its SI unit is the radian per second per tesla (rad⋅s−1⋅T−1) or, equivalently, the coulomb per kilogram (C⋅kg−1).

The term "gyromagnetic ratio" is often used as a synonym for a different but closely related quantity, the -factor. The -factor only differs from  the gyromagnetic ratio in being dimensionless.

For a classical rotating body
Consider a nonconductive charged body rotating about an axis of symmetry. According to the laws of classical physics, it has both a magnetic dipole moment due to the movement of charge and an angular momentum due to the movement of mass arising from its rotation. It can be shown that as long as its charge and mass density and flow are distributed identically and rotationally symmetric, its gyromagnetic ratio is 

The derivation of this relation is as follows. It suffices to demonstrate this for an infinitesimally narrow circular ring within the body, as the general result then follows from an integration. Suppose the ring has radius , area , mass , charge , and angular momentum . Then the magnitude of the magnetic dipole moment is

For an isolated electron
An isolated electron has an angular momentum and a magnetic moment resulting from its spin. While an electron's spin is sometimes visualized as a literal rotation about an axis, it cannot be attributed to mass distributed identically to the charge. The above classical relation does not hold, giving the wrong result by the absolute value of the electron's -factor, which is denoted :

where  is the Bohr magneton.

The gyromagnetic ratio due to electron spin is twice that due to the orbiting of an electron.

In the framework of relativistic quantum mechanics,

where  is the fine-structure constant. Here the small corrections to the relativistic result  come from the quantum field theory calculations of the anomalous magnetic dipole moment. The electron -factor is known to twelve decimal places by measuring the electron magnetic moment in a one-electron cyclotron:

The electron gyromagnetic ratio is

Gyromagnetic factor not as a consequence of relativity
Since a gyromagnetic factor equal to 2 follows from the Dirac's equation it is a frequent misconception to think that a -factor 2 is a consequence of relativity; it is not. The factor 2 can be obtained from the linearization of both the Schrödinger equation and the relativistic Klein–Gordon equation (which leads to Dirac's). In both cases a 4-spinor is obtained and for both linearizations the -factor is found to be equal to 2; Therefore, the factor 2 is a consequence of the minimal coupling and of the fact of having the same order of derivatives for space and time.

Physical spin  particles which cannot be described by the linear gauged Dirac equation satisfy the gauged Klein–Gordon equation extended by the  term according to,

Here,  and  stand for the Lorentz group generators in the Dirac space, and the electromagnetic tensor respectively, while  is the electromagnetic four-potential. An example for such a particle, is the spin  companion to spin  in the  representation space of the Lorentz group.

For a nucleus

Protons, neutrons, and many nuclei carry nuclear spin, which gives rise to a gyromagnetic ratio as above. The ratio is conventionally written in terms of the proton mass and charge, even for neutrons and for other nuclei, for the sake of simplicity and consistency. The formula is:

The gyromagnetic ratio of a nucleus plays a role in nuclear magnetic resonance (NMR) and magnetic resonance imaging (MRI). These procedures rely on the fact that bulk magnetization due to nuclear spins precess in a magnetic field at a rate called the Larmor frequency, which is simply the product of the gyromagnetic ratio with the magnetic field strength. With this phenomenon, the sign of  determines the sense (clockwise vs counterclockwise) of precession.

Most common nuclei such as 1H and 13C have positive gyromagnetic ratios. Approximate values for some common nuclei are given in the table below.

Larmor precession

Any free system with a constant gyromagnetic ratio, such as a rigid system of charges, a nucleus, or an electron, when placed in an external magnetic field  (measured in teslas) that is not aligned with its magnetic moment, will precess at a frequency  (measured in hertz), that is proportional to the external field:

Heuristic derivation
The derivation of this relation is as follows: First we must prove that the torque resulting from subjecting a magnetic moment  to a magnetic field  is  

The model of the spinning electron we use in the derivation has an evident analogy with a gyroscope. For any rotating body the rate of change of the angular momentum  equals the applied torque :

Note as an example the precession of a gyroscope. The earth's gravitational attraction applies a force or torque to the gyroscope in the vertical direction, and the angular momentum vector along the axis of the gyroscope rotates slowly about a vertical line through the pivot. In the place of the gyroscope imagine a sphere spinning around the axis and with its center on the pivot of the gyroscope, and along the axis of the gyroscope two oppositely directed vectors both originated in the center of the sphere, upwards  and downwards  Replace the gravity with a magnetic flux density 

Hence the angular velocity of the rotation of the spin is

Consequently, 
 

The angular precession frequency has an important physical meaning: It is the angular cyclotron frequency, the resonance frequency of an ionized plasma being under the influence of a static finite magnetic field, when we superimpose a high frequency electromagnetic field.

See also
Charge-to-mass ratio
Chemical shift
Landé --factor
Larmor equation
Proton gyromagnetic ratio

References

Atomic physics
Nuclear magnetic resonance
Ratios